Jackson Township is a township in White County, Arkansas, United States. Its total population was 419 as of the 2010 United States Census, an increase of 7.99 percent from 388 at the 2000 census.

According to the 2010 Census, Jackson Township is located at  (35.490330, -91.749921).

References

External links 

Townships in Arkansas
Populated places in White County, Arkansas